Lancaster Block may refer to:

in the United States
(by state)
Lancaster Block (Portland, Maine), listed on the National Register of Historic Places (NRHP) in Portland, Maine
Lancaster Block (Lincoln, Nebraska), NRHP-listed